DJ Jazzy Jeff & the Fresh Prince were an American hip hop duo from West Philadelphia, Pennsylvania, consisting of rapper Will Smith (the Fresh Prince) and disc jockey Jeff Townes (DJ Jazzy Jeff). Active full time from 1986 to 1994 and occasionally thereafter, they scored a string of light-hearted, inoffensive, and humorous hit singles.

The group received the first Grammy Award for Best Rap Performance in 1989 for "Parents Just Don't Understand" (1988), though their most successful single was "Summertime" (1991), which earned the group their second Grammy and peaked at number 4 on the Billboard Hot 100. Will Smith and Jeff Townes have remained close friends and claim that they never split up, having made songs together under Smith's solo performer credit. DJ Jazzy Jeff & the Fresh Prince have sold over 5.5 million albums in the US. They also performed together as recently as September 2019.

Career

1985–1988: Early years and Rock the House
Jeff Townes and Will Smith were introduced to each other by chance in 1985. One night, Townes was performing at a house party only a few doors down from Smith's residence, and he was missing his hype man. Smith decided to fill in. They both felt strong chemistry, and Townes was disappointed when his hype man finally made it to the party.

Soon after, the two decided to join forces. Smith enlisted a friend to join as the beatboxer of the group, Ready Rock C, who was not officially credited to the duo, only as a support live member. In 1986, Philadelphia-based Word Records (later changed to Word-Up Records) released their first single "Girls Ain't Nothing but Trouble," a tale of funny misadventures that landed Smith and his former DJ and rap partner Mark Forrest (Lord Supreme) in trouble. The song sampled the theme song of I Dream of Jeannie. Smith became known for light-hearted story-telling raps and capable, though profanity-free, "battle" rhymes. The single became a hit a month before Smith graduated from high school.

Based on this success, the duo was brought to the attention of Jive Records and Russell Simmons. The duo's first album, Rock the House, which was first released on Word Up in 1986, was rereleased on Jive in  March 1987. The album sold about 300,000 units. That same year, the band found itself on its first major tour with Run DMC, Public Enemy, and others.

1988–1989: He's the DJ, I'm the Rapper
Their 1988 follow-up album, He's the DJ, I'm the Rapper, made them multi-platinum stars. Mostly recorded in the United Kingdom, the album was rap music's first double-vinyl LP release; it was also issued as a single cassette and CD. "Parents Just Don't Understand", the lead-off single, made them MTV household names and also gained the honor of the first Grammy for a hip hop/rap song, which was met with mixed feelings. Nevertheless, the single was a success, launching the group into even more mainstream stardom. The video showed Prince's misadventures of trying to get around his parents' strict rules in a very comical way, very much like their first single "Girls Ain't Nothing but Trouble". It gained much airplay on TV channels such as MTV, giving the group much attention. The song was played in an episode of The Fresh Prince of Bel-Air ("Someday Your Prince Will Be In Effect (Part 1)"), and referenced in two other episodes of the same series ("The Fresh Prince Project" and "Not With My Pig, You Don't").

Another single, "A Nightmare on My Street", showcased a fictional confrontation with A Nightmare on Elm Street villain Freddy Krueger. The record's release coincided with A Nightmare on Elm Street 4: The Dream Master, which caused legal threats from the movie's distributor New Line Cinema. In response, the corresponding music video was pulled from release and a legal disclaimer was included on later pressings of He's the DJ, I'm the Rapper denying affiliation with the film. The video was released by Jazzy Jeff in 2018.

Jeff reveals on track 19 of Skillz's Infamous Quotes mixtape that New Line Cinema approached Will & Jeff for a movie role which they ended up turning down. The film was House Party. The last single from He's the DJ, I'm the Rapper was "Brand New Funk" sampled a James Brown song and quotes it. In the song, the Fresh Prince explains how Jeff has brought in a tape that contains a very cool song that he cannot help but rap over, and how fans react to it. The song was well received by many hip hop fans due to its funk sound, lyrical spins, and the fact that it showed off more of the skills of Jazzy Jeff. The video was shot in black and white, showed live performance clips from a concert and featured 2 Damn Hype Dancing.

1989–1990: And in This Corner...
1989 saw the release of And in This Corner…, the group's third LP. While the sales were a success, reaching gold, the duo's popularity was slipping. The crossover curse of various rap acts had come to pass, as their initial audience felt they had become too accessible; non-crossover rap acts like Big Daddy Kane and Boogie Down Productions had bigger street followings; meanwhile, pop radio had latched on to new faces like Tone Loc and Young MC, while non-radio followers became more enamored with hardcore acts like Ice-T and 2 Live Crew. The lead single, "I Think I Can Beat Mike Tyson" was in the same vein as their other lead singles; with this one having Will say he could literally beat Mike Tyson in a boxing match. Jazzy Jeff is shown training Prince to perform this task, and after Prince loses, Jeff then claims that he might be able to do it himself.

The next single was "Jazzy's Groove", sampling "Nautilus" in the chorus and bridge. The song features much more of Jazzy Jeff, like in "Brand New Funk"; Jazzy Jeff gives a 'math lesson' by making the sound clips add 1+1, 2+1, and 2+2. Due to a self-admitted spendthrift attitude, Smith felt he had nothing to lose when a producer from NBC and Quincy Jones approached him with an idea for a sitcom, with Townes appearing as a recurring character, named "Jazz". A popular running gag would have Uncle Phil (James Avery) literally throwing Jazz out of the house; however, this action is not restricted to Uncle Phil, as other characters, including Hilary Banks (Karyn Parsons), Geoffrey Butler (Joseph Marcell), the second Aunt Vivian (Daphne Maxwell Reid) and even Will himself, have thrown him out in the same manner. Another trademark on the show involved Jazz and Will greeting each other by slapping each other's hand, then swinging back in opposite directions while saying "Pssh!" The Fresh Prince of Bel-Air boosted his profile and his pocketbook. But Smith ended up squandering almost US$2.8m, while failing to pay any of it to the Internal Revenue Service in income taxation. Soon after And in This Corner... was released, Smith was found guilty of income-tax evasion by the IRS, and sentenced to pay this all back. For the first three seasons of The Fresh Prince of Bel-Air, Smith had 25% of his paycheck subjected to IRS garnishment.

In 1990 Ready Rock C decided not to continue as support. He later sued the duo alleging breach of contract, but lost in court.

1991–1994: Homebase, Code Red and split
Still having a bit of extra money from starring in the successful sitcom, the duo decided to stage a comeback album in 1991, Homebase.  The platinum album featured a more mature sound from the group, with Smith rapping in a deeper, consistent voice and changed their sound to fit the era's trend of hip-hop. Homebase featured the lead-off single "Summertime", which added rap lyrics to the music of the Kool & the Gang instrumental "Summer Madness" and has become one of their most enduring hits. The video features clips from a family reunion in Philly, and shows the duo being driven around while sitting atop a car. Summertime earned the duo its second Grammy win. The next singles were "Ring My Bell" and "Things That U Do". Both featured the typical sound of the early 90s. Both videos for the songs featured a different version from the original found on the LP.

The final single for the release was "You Saw My Blinker", a song about an old lady that crashed into Prince's new car and his anger at the events that happened thereafter. This is the first (and one of the only) songs where Smith curses, saying the word 'bitch' (To the left lane I tried to switch, then, you saw my blinker, bitch). Prince's voice is a bit deeper than usual, to make it sound like he's agitated, similar to "Then She Bit Me" from And in This Corner... This song reached No. 20 Billboard Hot 100 and No. 22 Hot R&B/Hip Hop singles. In 1992 for the Barcelona Olympic Games the duo released the song "Higher Baby" as part of the compilation album Barcelona Gold.

Code Red, their last studio LP as a duo, was released in 1993, reaching gold sales. This LP featured a self-admitted harder sound than their other songs, with Jazzy Jeff saying "We wanted to take a new direction. It wasn't that we were concentrating on harder, it was just different", featuring more jazz and soul samples than previous releases. The lead single "Boom! Shake the Room" reached No. 1 in UK, Ireland, Spain and Australia, and featured a harder sound than any of their other songs. Other singles were "I'm Looking For the One (To Be With Me)", which is similar to "Summertime", and "I Wanna Rock", which showed off more of Jazzy Jeff's DJ skills. Shortly afterward, Smith began to pursue acting full-time and the duo split. He and Townes ended up being sued by Jive, who alleged that the duo was still under contract to create more albums.

Occasional appearances
In 1998 the label released the compilation Greatest Hits with the hits and two previously unreleased songs. Years later, Will and Jazzy performed together sometimes in parties for close friends or selected events, but never announced a return as was credited as "DJ Jazzy Jeff & the Fresh Prince". In 2005, Smith and Townes performed together at the Philadelphia leg of Live 8. They performed in Croatia on August 26, 2017, Blackpool on August 27, and in Smith's 51st birthday on September 25, 2019.

Discography

Rock the House (1987)
He's the DJ, I'm the Rapper (1988)
And in This Corner... (1989)
Homebase (1991)
Code Red (1993)

Awards and nominations

American Music Awards

|-
|rowspan="2"|1989
|DJ Jazzy Jeff & The Fresh Prince
|Favorite Rap/Hip-Hop Artist
|
|-
|He's the DJ, I'm the Rapper
|Favorite Rap/Hip-Hop Album
|
|-
|rowspan="3"|1992
|rowspan="2"|DJ Jazzy Jeff & The Fresh Prince
|Favorite Soul/R&B Band/Duo/Group
|
|-
|Favorite Rap/Hip-Hop Artist
|
|-
|Homebase
|Favorite Rap/Hip-Hop Album
|
|}

Grammy Awards

|-
|1989
|"Parents Just Don't Understand"
|Best Rap Performance
|
|-
|1990
|"I Think I Can Beat Mike Tyson"
|Best Rap Performance
|
|-
|1991
|"And in This Corner..."
|Best Rap Performance by a Duo or Group
|
|-
|1992
|"Summertime"
|Best Rap Performance by a Duo or Group
|
|}

MTV Video Music Awards

|-
|rowspan="3"|1989
|rowspan="3"|"Parents Just Don't Understand"
|Best Rap Video
|
|-
|Best Direction
|
|-
|Best Art Direction
|
|-
|1991
|"Summertime"
|Best Rap Video
|
|}

Soul Train Music Awards

|-
|1989
|He's the DJ, I'm the Rapper
|Best Rap Album
|
|}

References

External links

Jeff and Fresh Prince Fansite

African-American musical groups
Grammy Award winners for rap music
Hip hop groups from Philadelphia
Jive Records artists
Will Smith
Musical groups established in 1985
Musical groups disestablished in 1994
American musical duos
Hip hop duos
1985 establishments in Pennsylvania